Lysias (c. 445 – c. 380 BC) was a logographer (speech writer) in Ancient Greece. He was one of the ten Attic orators included in the "Alexandrian Canon" compiled by Aristophanes of Byzantium and Aristarchus of Samothrace in the third century BC.

Life
According to Dionysius of Halicarnassus and the author of the life ascribed to Plutarch, Lysias was born in 459 BC, which would accord with a tradition that Lysias reached, or passed, the age of eighty.  This date was evidently obtained by reckoning back from the foundation of Thurii (444 BC), since there was a tradition that Lysias had gone there at the age of fifteen. Modern critics, in general, place his birth later, c. 445 BC, and place the trip to Thurii around 430 BC.

Cephalus, his father, was a native of Syracuse, and on the invitation of Pericles had settled at Athens. The opening scene of Plato's Republic is set at the house of his eldest son, Polemarchus, in Piraeus. The tone of the picture warrants the inference that the Sicilian family were well known to Plato, and that their houses must often have been hospitable to such gatherings. Further, Plato's Phaedrus opens with Phaedrus coming from conversation with Lysias at the house of Epicrates of Athens: he meets Socrates, with whom he will read and discuss the speech of Lysias he heard.

At Thurii, the colony newly planted on the Tarentine Gulf, the boy may have seen Herodotus, now a man in middle life, and a friendship may have grown up between them. There, too, Lysias is said to have commenced his studies in rhetoric—doubtless under a master of the Sicilian school possibly, as tradition said, under Tisias, the pupil of Corax, whose name is associated with the first attempt to formulate rhetoric as an art. The Athenian invasion of Sicily in 415–413 BC during the Peloponnesian War would ultimately create difficulties for Lysias's family, especially when the campaign ended in a devastating defeat for Athens. The continued attempt to link Lysias to the famous names of the era is illustrated by the ancient ascription to Lysias of a rhetorical exercise purporting to be a speech in which the captive Athenian general Nicias appealed for mercy to the Sicilians. The terrible blow to Athens quickened the energies of an anti-Athenian faction at Thurii. Lysias and his elder brother Polemarchus, with three hundred other persons, were accused of Atticizing. They were driven from Thurii and settled at Athens (412 BC).

Lysias and Polemarchus were rich men, having inherited property from their father, Cephalus; and Lysias claims that, though merely resident aliens, they discharged public services with a liberality which shamed many of those who enjoyed the franchise (Against Eratosthenes xii.20). The fact that they owned house property shows that they were classed as isoteleis, i.e. foreigners who paid only the same tax as citizens, being exempt from the special tax (μετοίκιον) on resident aliens. Polemarchus occupied a house in Athens itself, Lysias another in the Piraeus, near which was their shield factory, employing a hundred and twenty skilled slaves.

In 404 BC, the Thirty Tyrants were established at Athens under the protection of a Spartan garrison. One of their earliest measures was an attack upon the resident aliens, who were represented as disaffected to the new government. Lysias and Polemarchus were on a list of ten singled out to be the first victims. Polemarchus was arrested and compelled to drink hemlock. Lysias had a narrow escape, with the help of a large bribe. He slipped by a back-door out of the house in which he was a prisoner and took a boat to Megara. It appears that he rendered valuable services to the exiles during the reign of the tyrants, and in 403 Thrasybulus proposed that these services be recognised by the bestowal of the citizenship. The Boule, however, had not yet been reconstituted, and hence the measure could not be introduced to the ecclesia by the requisite preliminary resolution (προβούλευμα). On this ground, it was successfully opposed.

During his later years, Lysias—now probably a comparatively poor man owing to the rapacity of the tyrants and his own generosity to the Athenian exiles—appears as a hard-working member of a new profession—that of logographer,  a writer of speeches to be delivered in the law courts. The thirty-four extant are but a small fraction. From 403 to about 380 BC, his industry must have been incessant. The notices of his personal life in these years are scanty. In 403 he came forward as the accuser of Eratosthenes, one of the Thirty Tyrants. This was his only direct contact with Athenian politics. The story that he wrote a defence for Socrates, which the latter declined to use, probably arose from a confusion. Several years after the death of Socrates, the sophist Polycrates composed a declamation against him, to which Lysias replied.

A more authentic tradition represents Lysias as having spoken his own Olympiacus at the Olympic festival of 388 BC, to which Dionysius I of Syracuse had sent a magnificent embassy. Tents embroidered with gold were pitched within the sacred enclosure, and the wealth of Dionysius was vividly shown by the number of chariots which he had entered. Lysias lifted up his voice to denounce Dionysius as, next to Artaxerxes, the worst enemy of Hellas, and to impress upon the assembled Greeks that one of their foremost duties was to deliver Sicily from a hateful oppression. The latest work of Lysias which can be dated (a fragment of a speech For Pherenicus) belongs to 381 or 380 BC. He probably died in or soon after 380 BC.

Style
Lysias displays literary tact, humour, and attention to character in his extant speeches, and is famous for using his skill to conceal his art. It was obviously desirable that a speech written for delivery by a client should be suitable to his age, station and circumstances. Lysias was the first to make this adaptation really artistic. His language is crafted to flow easily, in contrast to his predecessor Antiphon's pursuit of majestic emphasis, to his pupil (and close follower in many respects) Isaeus' more conspicuous display of artistry and more strictly logical manner of argumentation, and later to the forceful oratory of Demosthenes.

Translated into terms of ancient criticism, he became the model of the plain style (: genus tenue or subtile). Greek and then Roman critics distinguished three styles of rhetorical composition—the grand (or elaborate), the plain and the middle, the plain being nearest to the language of daily life. Greek rhetoric began in the grand style; then Lysias set an exquisite pattern of the plain; and Demosthenes might be considered as having effected an almost ideal compromise.

The vocabulary of Lysias is relatively simple and would later be regarded as a model of pure diction for Atticists. Most of the rhetorical figures are sparingly used—except such as consist in the parallelism or opposition of clauses. The taste of the day not yet emancipated from the influence of the Sicilian rhetoric probably demanded a large use of antithesis. Lysias excels in vivid description; he has also the knack of marking the speaker's character by light touches. The structure of his sentences varies a good deal according to the dignity of the subject. He has equal command over the periodic style (κατεστραμμένη λέξις) and the non-periodic or continuous (εἰρομένη, διαλελυμένη). His disposition of his subject-matter is always simple. The speech has usually four parts: introduction (προοίμιον), narrative of facts (διήγησις), proofs (πίστεις), which may be either external, as from witnesses, or internal, derived from argument on the facts, and, lastly, conclusion (ἐπίλογος).

It is in the introduction and the narrative that Lysias is seen at his best. In his greatest extant speech—that Against Eratosthenes—and also in the fragmentary Olympiacus, he has pathos and fire; but these were not characteristic qualities of his work. In Cicero's judgment (De Orat. iii. 7, 28) Demosthenes was peculiarly distinguished by force (vis), Aeschines by resonance (sonitus); Hypereides by acuteness (acumen); Isocrates by sweetness (suavitas); the distinction which he assigns to Lysias is subtilitas, an Attic refinement—which, as he elsewhere says (Brutus, 16, 64) is often joined to an admirable vigour (lacerti). Nor was it oratory alone to which Lysias rendered service; his work had an important effect on all subsequent Greek prose, by showing how perfect elegance could be joined to plainness. Here, in his artistic use of familiar idiom, he might fairly be called the Euripides of Attic prose. His style has attracted interest from modern readers, because it is employed in describing scenes from the everyday life of Athens.

Works

Table of extant speeches
From Lysias we have thirty-four speeches. Three fragmentary ones have come down under the name of Lysias; one hundred and twenty-seven more, now lost, are known from smaller fragments or from titles. In the Augustan age four hundred and twenty-five works bore his name, of which more than two hundred were allowed as genuine by the critics.

The table below shows the name of the speech (in the ordered listed in the Lamb translation), the suggested date of the speech, the primary rhetorical mode, the main point of the speech, and comments. Forensic is synonymous with judicial and denotes speeches made in law courts. Epideictic is ceremonial and involves the praise or, less often, the criticism, of the subject. Deliberative denotes speeches made in legislatures. Notes (e.g., A1, B3, etc.) refer to the list of qualifications below the table.

NOTES "A": FORENSIC, RELATING TO PUBLIC CASES
 Relating to Offences directly against the State; such as treason, malversation in office, embezzlement of public moneys.
 Cases relating to Unconstitutional Procedure
 Cases relating to *Claims for Money withheld from the State.
 Cases relating to a Scrutiny (δοκιμασία); especially the Scrutiny, by the Senate, of Officials Designate
 Cases relating to Military Offences
 Cases relating to Murder or Intent to Murder
 Cases relating to Impiety

NOTES "B": FORENSIC, RELATING TO PRIVATE CASES
 Action for Libel (δίκη κακηγορίας)
 Action by a Ward against a Guardian
 Trial of a Claim to Property (διαδικασία)
 Answer to a Special Plea

Miscellaneous 
To his Companions, a Complaint of Slanders, viii. (certainly spurious).

The speech attributed to Lysias in Plato's Phaedrus 230e–234. This speech has generally been regarded as Plato's own work; but the certainty of this conclusion will be doubted by those who observe:
the elaborate preparations made in the dialogue for a recital of the erōtikos which shall be verbally exact,
the closeness of the criticism made upon it.
If the satirist were merely analysing his own composition, such criticism would have little point. Lysias is the earliest writer who is known to have composed erōtikoi; it is as representing both rhetoric and a false erōs that he is the object of attack in the Phaedrus.  Stylistic differences between the speech and the rest of the Phaedrus have also been taken to suggest that the speech was genuine.

Fragments
Three hundred and fifty-five of these are collected by Hermann Sauppe, Oratores Attici, ii. 170–216. Two hundred and fifty-two of them represent one hundred and twenty-seven speeches of known title; and of six the fragments are comparatively large. Of these, the fragmentary speech For Pherenicus belongs to 381 or 380 BC, and is thus the latest known work of Lysias. In literary and historical interest, the first place among the extant speeches of Lysias belongs to that Against Eratosthenes (403 BC), one of the Thirty Tyrants, whom Lysias arraigns as the murderer of his brother Polemarchus. The speech is an eloquent and vivid picture of the reign of terror which the Thirty established at Athens; the concluding appeal, to both parties among the citizens, is specially powerful.

Next in importance is the speech Against Agoratus (388 BC), one of our chief authorities for the internal history of Athens during the months which immediately followed; the defeat at Aegospotami. The Olympiacus (388 BC) is a brilliant fragment, expressing the spirit of the festival at Olympia, and exhorting Greeks to unite against their common foes. The Plea for the Constitution (403 BC) is interesting for the manner in which it argues that the well-being of Athens—now stripped of empire—is bound up with the maintenance of democratic principles. The speech For Mantitheus (392 BC) is a graceful and animated portrait, of a young Athenian hippeus, making a spirited defence of his honor against the charge of disloyalty. The defence For the Invalid is a humorous character-sketch. The speech Against Pancleon illustrates the intimate relations between Athens and Plataea, while it gives us some picturesque glimpses of Athenian town life. The defence of the person who had, been charged with destroying a mona, or sacred olive, places us amidst the country life of Attica. And the speech Against Theomnestus deserves attention for its curious evidence of the way in which the ordinary vocabulary of Athens had changed between 600 and 400 BC.

Notes

References
Editions by
Aldus (Editio princeps, Venice, 1513)
with variorum notes, by J. J. Reiske (1772)
Immanuel Bekker (1823)
W. S. Dobson (1828) in Oratores Attici
Johann Georg Baiter and Hermann Sauppe, Oratores Attici, vol. 1, Zurich, 1839, pp. 59 ff.
C. Scheibe (1852)
T. Thalheim (1901, Teubner series, with bibliography) – PDF
C. G. Cobet (4th ed., by J. J. Hartman, 1905)
, Oxford Classical Texts, 1912
W. R. M. Lamb, Loeb Classical Library, 1930
Umberto Albini, Greek text and Italian translation, Florence: Sansoni, 1955
Enrico Medda, Greek text and Italian translation, 2 vols., Milan: BUR, 1992–1995
Christopher Carey, Oxford Classical Texts, 2007

Editions of select speeches by
J. H. Bremi (1845)
R. Rauchenstein (1848, revised by C. Fuhr, 1880–1881)
H. Frohberger (1866–1871)
H. van Herwerden (1863)
Andreas Weidner (1888)
Evelyn Shirley Shuckburgh (1882) – PDF
 F. J. Snell, Epitaphios, Clarendon Press, (1887)
A. Westermann and W. Binder (1887–1890)
G. P. Bristol (1892)
M. H. Morgan (1895) – PDF
W. H. Wait (1898) – PDF
C. D. Adams (1905) – PDF
 There is a special lexicon to Lysias by D. H. Holmes (Bonn, 1895, online). See also Jebb's Attic Orators (1893, vol. 1, vol. 2) and Selections from the Attic Orators (2nd ed.; 1st ed. online).
 The first volume of a full commentary on the speeches is S. C. Todd, A Commentary on Lysias, Speeches 1–11. Oxford: Oxford University Press, 2007. pp. ix, 783. .

Further reading
 Bateman, John J. 1958. "Lysias and the Law." Transactions of the American Philological Association 89:276–285.
 Dover, Kenneth J., ed. 1968. Lysias and the Corpus Lysiacum. Berkeley and Los Angeles: California Univ. Press.
 Figueira, T. 1986. "Sitopolai and Sitophylakes in Lysias’ “Against the Graindealers”: Governmental Intervention in the Athenian Economy." Phoenix 40:149–171.
 Gagarin, Michael. 2001. "Women’s Voices in Attic Oratory." In Making Silence Speak. Women’s Voices in Greek Literature and Society. Edited by L. McClure and A. Lardinois, 161–176. Princeton, NJ: Princeton Univ. Press.
 Griffith-Williams, Brenda. 2013. Violence in Court: Law and Rhetoric in Athenian and English Assault Cases. Greece and Rome 60.1: 89–100.
 Lateiner, Donald. 1981. "An Analysis of Lysias’ Political Defense Speeches." Rivista storica dell’Antichità 11:147–160.
 Loening, Thomas C. 1981. "The Autobiographical Speeches of Lysias and the Biographical Tradition." Hermes 109:280–294.
 Rydberg-Cox, Jeff. 2005. "Talking about Violence: Clustered Participles in the Speeches of Lysias." Literary and Linguistic Computing 20.2: 219–235.
 Shear, Julia L. 2013. "Their Memories Will Never Grow Old: The Politics of Remembrance in the Athenian Funeral Orations." Classical Quarterly 63.2: 511–536.
 Wolpert, Andrew. 2002. "Lysias 18 and Athenian Memory of Civil War." Transactions of the American Philological Association 132.1–2: 109–126.

External links 

 
 
 The Speeches of Lysias – links to online translations
 Life of Lysias – attributed to Plutarch
 
 

Attic orators
Sicilian Greeks
Metics in Classical Athens
5th-century BC Greek people
4th-century BC Greek people
440s BC births
380s BC deaths